The 8th General Junta was the meeting of the General Junta, the parliament of the Principality of Asturias, with the membership determined by the results of the regional election held on 22 May 2011. The congress met for the first time on 15 June 2011. It is the shortest meeting of the democratic General Junta as it ended after then President of Asturias, Francisco Álvarez-Cascos, called a snap election, being the first non-historic autonomous community (different from Andalusia, Catalonia, the Basque Country or Galicia) to do so.

Election 
The 8th Asturian regional election was held on 22 May 2011. At the election, Asturias Forum (FAC), a split from the People's Party (PP), won the most seats despite PSOE obtaining more votes.

History 
The new parliament met for the first time on 15 June 2011. Fernando Goñi (PP) was elected as the president of the General Junta, with the support of PP and PSOE.

Deaths, resignations and suspensions 
The 8th General Junta has seen the following deaths, resignations and suspensions:

 20 July 2011 - María Isabel Marqués (Foro) resigned after being appointed Minister of Infrastructures, Territorial Planning and Environment in the Asturian government. Isidro Martínez Oblanca (Foro) resigned after being appointed senator by the General Junta. José Manuel Rivero (Foro) resigned after being appointed Minister of Economy and Employment in the Asturian government. Marcial González (Foro), Lilián María Fernández (Foro) and Josefina María Asunción Collado (Foro) replaced them, respectively, on 29 July 2011.
 7 December 2011 - Enrique Álvarez Sostres (Foro) resigned after being elected member of the Congress of Deputies. Manuel Fano (Foro) replaced him on 15 December 2011.

Members

References

External links 

 Official website of the General Junta
 All members of the General Junta

General Junta of the Principality of Asturias
2011 establishments in Spain